The class of perfection is an advanced ballet class for the highest ranking ballerinas in a ballet company. In Russia, the traditional class of perfection has been replaced by the unified company class, but the term may still be used informally for the special classes taken by only the highest ranking dancers in a company.

Early history
The class of perfection at the Imperial Choreographic School was taught by Christian Johansson, who had himself been a pupil of Danish balletmaster August Bournonville. After Johansson, the responsibility of teaching the class passed to his former student Nikolai Legat. Many of Russian ballets legendary dancers were once pupils of Legat's class of perfection including Njinsky, Mikhail Fokine and the most important ballerinas of the time. Ballet mistress Agrippina Vaganova had also been one of Legat's class of perfection students.

Teachers

References

External links
Excerpts from Mariinsky ballet company class
Bolshoi ballet excerpts of company class

Ballet training